3141 Buchar, provisional designation , is a dark Cybele asteroid from the outermost region of the asteroid belt, approximately  in diameter. It was discovered on 2 September 1984, by Czech astronomer Antonín Mrkos at the Kleť Observatory. The D-type asteroid has a rotation period of 11.4 hours. It was named in memory of Czechoslovakian astronomer Emil Buchar.

Orbit and classification 

Buchar is located in the dynamical region of the Cybele asteroids. It is a non-family asteroid from the main belt's background population. It orbits the Sun in the outermost asteroid belt at a distance of 3.1–3.7 AU once every 6 years and 3 months (2,288 days; semi-major axis of 3.4 AU). Its orbit has an eccentricity of 0.08 and an inclination of 11° with respect to the ecliptic.

Physical characteristics 

Buchar has been characterized as dark D-type asteroid in both the Tholen-like and Bus–Binzel-like taxonomy of the Small Solar System Objects Spectroscopic Survey (S3OS2). It is also an assumed C-type asteroid.

Rotation period 

In November 2004, a rotational lightcurve of Buchar was obtained from photometric observations by French amateur astronomer Laurent Bernasconi. Lightcurve analysis gave a rotation period of 11.41 hours with a brightness amplitude of 0.47 magnitude.

Diameter and albedo 

According to the surveys carried out by the Infrared Astronomical Satellite IRAS and the Japanese Akari satellite, Buchar measures between 36.05 and 40.13 kilometers in diameter and its surface has an albedo between 0.069 and 0.0858. The Collaborative Asteroid Lightcurve Link derives an albedo of 0.0656 and a diameter of 35.91 kilometers based on an absolute magnitude of 10.8.

Naming 

This minor planet was named in memory of Czechoslovakian astronomer Emil Buchar (1901–1979), discoverer of asteroid 1055 Tynka and one of the pioneers of satellite geodesy. He was a professor of astronomy and geodesy at Czech Technical University in Prague. The official naming citation was published by the Minor Planet Center on 29 November 1993.

References

External links 
 Asteroid Lightcurve Database (LCDB), query form (info )
 Dictionary of Minor Planet Names, Google books
 Asteroids and comets rotation curves, CdR – Observatoire de Genève, Raoul Behrend
 Discovery Circumstances: Numbered Minor Planets (1)-(5000) – Minor Planet Center
 
 

003141
003141
Discoveries by Antonín Mrkos
Named minor planets
19840902